Huang Hu (1973 in Wuchuan, Guangdong, China – 3 January 2003 in Zhanjiang, Guangdong, China) was a Chinese criminal, who contaminated the salt supply of a kindergarten class with rat poison on 24 November 2002. The adulterated salt was subsequently consumed, and 70 children and two teachers were hospitalized. However, all of them survived. Huang Hu was arrested the following month in December, and then sentenced to death on 18 December 2002. Sixteen days later, Huang Hu was executed.

References

1973 births
21st-century Chinese criminals
21st-century executions by China
Chinese male criminals
People executed by China by firearm
Executed People's Republic of China people
2003 deaths
People from Zhanjiang
Executed people from Guangdong
Poisoners